Prince Konrad of Bavaria (22 November 1883 – 6 September 1969) was a member of the Bavarian Royal House of Wittelsbach.

Early life

Konrad was born in Munich, Bavaria. He was the youngest child of Prince Leopold of Bavaria and his wife Archduchess Gisela of Austria.
During World War I, like his older brother Georg, Konrad served in the Bavarian army mainly on the Eastern Front as a commander of the 2nd Royal Bavarian Heavy Cavalry "Archduke Francis Ferdinand of Austria" Konrad reached the rank of Major and resigned from the military on 6 February 1919.

Marriage
On 8 January 1921 Prince Konrad married Princess Bona Margherita of Savoy-Genoa, the daughter of Prince Tomaso of Savoy-Genoa and Princess Isabella of Bavaria. The wedding took place at the Castello Agliè in Piedmont, Italy.

The couple had two children:

Princess Amalie Isabella of Bavaria (15 December 1921 in Munich – 28 March 1985 in Milan), married on 25 August 1949 in Lugano, Count Umberto Poletti-Galimberta, Count of Assandri (21 June 1921 in Milan – 18 February 1995 in Milan), son of Luciano Poletti and Adriana Galimberti. They have issue.
Prince Eugen of Bavaria (16 July 1925 in Munich – 1 January 1997 in Grasse), married Countess Helene of Khevenhüller-Metsch (4 April 1921 in Vienna – 25 December 2017 in Bad Hindelang), daughter of Count Franz of Khevenhüller-Metsch and Princess Anna of Fürstenberg. They have no issue.

Post World War II

At the end of the Second World War, Prince Konrad was arrested by the French military at Hinterstein, brought to Lindau and temporarily interned in the hotel Bayerischer Hof, together with among others, the German Crown Prince Wilhelm and the former Nazi diplomat Hans Georg von Mackensen. Princess Bona who worked during the war as a nurse, stayed afterwards with her relatives in Savoy, prohibited from entering Germany, she was not reunited with her family until 1947. In the later years Prince Konrad worked on the Board of German auto-maker NSU.

Death

Prince Konrad of Bavaria died on 6 September 1969 at Hinterstein in the Oberallgäu region of Bavaria. He is buried at the Andechs Abbey cemetery in Bavaria.

Honours 
He received the following orders and decorations:

Ancestry

References

Sources
Schad, Martha,Kaiserin Elisabeth und ihre Töchter. München, Langen Müller, 1998

Princes of Bavaria
House of Wittelsbach
1883 births
1969 deaths
People from the Kingdom of Bavaria
Members of the Bavarian Reichsrat
Military personnel of Bavaria
Burials at Andechs Abbey
Recipients of the Iron Cross (1914)
Knights of the Golden Fleece of Austria
Grand Crosses of the Order of Saint Stephen of Hungary
Grand Crosses of the Order of Christ (Portugal)
Knights of the Order of Montesa
Honorary Knights Grand Cross of the Royal Victorian Order